Trawden is a village in the Trawden Forest parish of Pendle, at the foot of Boulsworth Hill, in Lancashire, England. The village co-operatively owns and runs its library, shop, community centre and pub.

Activities 

As a way of encouraging people to visit Trawden and the surrounding area, a small group of village residents organise and mobilise other villagers in order to hold the annual Trawden Garden Festival and Scarecrow Trail. This takes place over the first weekend in July.

Trawden also holds an annual agricultural show on the 2nd Sunday in August, which many farmers, riders and people from around Lancashire enjoy and take part in.

Trawden F.C. were champions of the Pendle Charity League Second Division in the 2006–07 season.

Trawden Athletic Club is a running club consisting of around 400 members (as of January 2017) who compete in local and regional road, fell, trail and cross country races.

The Trawden Forest Community Centre is in the heart of the village.  The Centre is run by a Committee of Trustees made up of volunteers from the local community. It is entirely self-funded, covering running costs through user fees supplemented by fundraising.  Several local groups meet regularly at the centre and it is also used for many private and community events.

Trawden in Bloom is a voluntary organisation which is responsible for planting the baskets around the village, weeding and generally keeping the parish colourful and tidy. 
They include is a group of youngsters, called the Young Bloomers, who have their own raised beds for growing flowers and vegetables, besides planting tubs and weeding the pavements.

Economy

Agriculture was formerly the main industry of the village and surrounding area, although it did have several mills, most of which have now been demolished for, or converted to, housing.

Wycoller is a lived-in hamlet in the Trawden Forest; it is also an important tourist destination and country park. It is the most visited part of the Forest and there are two visitor centres, the aisled Barn adjoining Wycoller Hall and Pepper Hill Barn, both managed by Lancashire County Council.

The village co-operatively owns and runs its library, shop, community centre and pub, in a venture described in The Daily Telegraph in 2022 as "a model for cooperative local living that offers inspiration and hope to declining settlements across the world". The village took over the library in 2017, obtaining grant funding to rebuild it with solar panels and ground-source heat pump. The village raised £450,000 in 2021 to buy the Victorian era pub. 120 volunteers do 2-hour shifts to operate the shop; it operates profitably with takings of £500,000 a year.

See also

 Listed buildings in Trawden Forest
 Colne and Trawden Light Railway Company

References

External links

 Pendle Net – Trawden Webpages
 Trawden Garden Festival and Scarecrow Trail Website
 Trawden Online Website
 Trawden Show
 Trawden Athletic Club
 Trawden School
 Mike Baker Website – who was born in Trawden
 Mike Baker Website – Cottontree a hamlet nestled between Colne and Trawden
 Any Village Trawden site

Towns and villages in the Borough of Pendle